Obdulia Romelia Luna Luna (? - 1980) was the first Ecuadorian woman to obtain a law degree. She graduated on June 15, 1928, at the university of Guayaquil. She worked as secretary of the first Chamber of the Superior Court of Justice of Guayaquil.

References

Ecuadorian women lawyers
People from Guayaquil